This is a list of domestic water buffalo breeds and their uses.

Breeds
The domestic water buffalo (Bubalus bubalis) is descended from the wild water buffalo (Bubalus arnee), now designated an endangered species. Water buffaloes have been bred, predominantly in Asia, for thousands of years for use by humans. Their main domestic uses are as draught animals and for the production of milk and meat. Two types are recognized, the river-type and the swamp-type.
Note: except where otherwise indicated, the reference for all entries is DAD-IS.

See also

List of cattle breeds

References

Sources

External links

 
Water buffalo